József Madarász de Kisfalud (27 August 1814 – 31 January 1915) was a Hungarian lawyer and politician, who served as Speaker of the House of Representatives between 1898 and 1899. He functioned as an emissary in the Hungarian Diet of 1832-1836. Later he served as Member of Parliament from 1848 to 1915, his death (except the period between 1848 and 1867 when the National Assembly was not convened).

Biography
He was born into a Calvinist family, his parents were court judge Gedeon Madarász and Zsófia Tóth.

See also
Laszló Lovassy
Ferenc Pulszky

References
 Jónás, Károly - Villám, Judit: A Magyar Országgyűlés elnökei 1848-2002. Argumentum, Budapest, 2002. pp. 129–133

1814 births
1915 deaths
Hungarian centenarians
Hungarian Calvinist and Reformed Christians
Men centenarians
Speakers of the House of Representatives of Hungary
Left Centre politicians